Jeremy Ross Jeffress (born September 21, 1987) is an American professional baseball pitcher who is a free agent. He has played in Major League Baseball (MLB) for the Kansas City Royals, Toronto Blue Jays, Texas Rangers, Milwaukee Brewers, and Chicago Cubs. Jeffress was an All-Star in 2018.

Career

Milwaukee Brewers

After graduating from Halifax County High School in South Boston, Virginia, Jeffress was selected by the Milwaukee Brewers as the 16th overall pick in the 2006 Major League Baseball draft. He signed a contract with a $1.55 million signing bonus in 2006.

In 2008, Jeffress started on the Brevard County Manatees' roster on the restricted list. On August 6, the Milwaukee Brewers organization announced that he was promoted to their Double-A team, the Huntsville Stars. Jeffress began the 2009 season with Huntsville, but struggled and was sent back to Brevard County in May 2009. At the beginning of the 2010 campaign, he was sent down to the Class A affiliate, the Wisconsin Timber Rattlers.

On July 1, 2010, Jeffress was called up to Class A-Advanced Brevard County, where he continued to throw out of the bullpen. Jeffress was later promoted to Huntsville. He was called up to the majors for the first time on September 1, 2010. Jeffress made his major league debut that evening, pitching one scoreless inning. On the year, Jeffress made 10 appearances, finishing with a 1–0 record with a 2.70 ERA in 10 innings with 10 strikeouts and 6 walks.

Kansas City Royals
On December 18, 2010, Jeffress was traded to the Kansas City Royals with Alcides Escobar, Lorenzo Cain, and Jake Odorizzi for Zack Greinke and Yuniesky Betancourt.  In spring training in 2011, Jeffress led the major leagues in wild pitches, with five in 11 innings. 
Jeffress began the year on the Royals roster, and got his first win as a Royal on April 5 against the Chicago White Sox. He made 14 appearances with a 4.70 ERA in 15.1 innings of work, adding on 13 strikeouts, but also had 11 walks and 12 hits allowed. On May 21, Jeffress was optioned to the Omaha Storm Chasers, the Royals Triple-A affiliate, posting a 7.13 ERA in 16 games, 3 of which were starts. These struggles led him to be moved down to the Royals Double-A affiliate, the Northwest Arkansas Naturals on July 20, were he appeared in 9 games, starting 8, posting a 4.26 ERA in 31.2 innings, adding on 20 strikeouts as well as 22 walks and 32 hits allowed.

In the 2012 season, Jeffress split time between the Storm Chasers and Royals, as he was unable to find his footing in the majors posting a 6.75 ERA in just 13 appearances, allowing 19 hits, 14 runs and 14 walks to just 14 strikeouts in 13.1 innings. His play in the minors showed signs of improvement as he made 37 appearances, going 5–4 with 4.97 ERA, with 61 strikeouts to just 25 walks.

On November 2, 2012, the Royals designated Jeffress for assignment.

Toronto Blue Jays
On November 8, 2012, the Toronto Blue Jays received Jeffress from the Royals in exchange for cash considerations. Jeffress was designated for assignment by the Blue Jays on April 6, 2013 after pitching in one game.  Jeffress cleared waivers, and was assigned outright to the Triple-A Buffalo Bisons on April 16. Jeffress was sent to the Class A Dunedin Blue Jays on April 25 without having pitched for the Bisons. He was brought up to the Bisons on May 3. His contract was selected by the Blue Jays on September 3 after the Bisons season ended, and the major league rosters expanded. He appeared in 10 games for the Blue Jays posting a 0.87 ERA in 10.1 innings, while in his time with the Bison he had a 1–0 record with a 1.65 ERA in 25 appearances.

Jeffress opened the 2014 season on the major league roster, where he struggled mightly after showing flashes the year prior. In just 3 appearances, Jeffress posted a 10.80 ERA in 3 innings of work. Jeffress was designated for assignment after the game on April 4, 2014. On April 15, after clearing waivers, Jeffress was assigned to Buffalo; however, he chose free agency rather than report to Buffalo.

Return to the Milwaukee Brewers
Jeffress signed a minor league contract with the Milwaukee Brewers on April 18, 2014. He was assigned to the Triple-A Nashville Sounds. The Brewers selected the contract of Jeffress from Nashville on July 21, 2014. Jeffress thrived in his return to Milwaukee, emerging as a stellar setup-man to closer Francisco Rodriguez and posting a 1–1 record with a 1.88 ERA in 29 games.

In 2015, after struggles from setup man Jonathan Broxton, Jeffress took over as the eight-inning man for Milwaukee. He continued his success from last season in his new role, posting a 2.65 ERA in 68 innings, striking out 67 batters while walking just 22 in 72 appearances.

In 2016, Jeffress was slated to be Milwaukee's setup man to closer Will Smith but before spring training could begin, Jeffress was named closer when Smith suffered a knee injury.
As the closer, Jeffress made 47 appearances, posting a 2.22 ERA with 27 saves (Tied for 4th in NL at the time) in 58 innings, striking out 35 batters while walking only 11.

Texas Rangers

On August 1, 2016, the Brewers traded Jeffress and Jonathan Lucroy to the Texas Rangers for Lewis Brinson, Luis Ortiz, and a player to be named later. 
He made 9 appearances following the trade, posting a 4.00 ERA in 9 innings, before being placed on the restricted list for a DUI. Jeffress would make 3 more appearances following his return, finishing the season with a 3–2 record with a 2.33 ERA in 58 innings with 27 saves, which was good enough for 7th in the National League despite only playing half the season there.

After a 2016 season on-par with his career statistics, Jeffress struggled with the Rangers in 2017. He posted a 5.31 ERA and a 1–2 record over 40.2 innings while with the Rangers that season.

Third stint with Milwaukee
On July 31, 2017, the Rangers traded Jeffress to the Milwaukee Brewers for Tayler Scott. He made 22 appearances following the trade posting a 4–0 record with a 3.65 ERA in 24.2 innings.

In 2018, Jeffress returned to his former setup man role, with Corey Knebel following him. Jeffress had a 0.99 ERA in 45.1 innings in the first half of the season, with fellow bullpen arm Josh Hader posting a 1.55 ERA in 46.1 innings, creating a dominant bullpen for the contending Brewers. On July 12, 2018, Jeffress was named to his first All-Star team as a replacement for Sean Doolittle. On the season, Jeffress appeared in 73 games, posting an 8–1 record with 1.29 ERA in 76.2 innings, as well as 15 saves.

Jeffress began the 2019 season with the Brewers Triple-A affiliate, the San Antonio Missions, after suffering a shoulder injury in spring training. On August 25, Jeffress was placed on the 10-day injured list after suffering a hip injury, and was later released by the Brewers on September 1.

Chicago Cubs
On January 28, 2020, Jeffress was signed by the Chicago Cubs for a one-year, $850,000 major league contract, with the possibility he could earn an additional $200,000 based on games pitched. During the shortened 2020 season, Jeffress earned eight saves, recorded a 1.54 ERA, and held opposing hitters to a .137 batting average. He was one of the Cubs' three nominees for the 2020 All-MLB Team and was a finalist for the NL Reliever of the Year award.

Washington Nationals
On February 22, 2021, Jeffress signed a minor league contract with the Washington Nationals organization that included an invitation to Spring Training. On March 7, Jeffress was released by the Nationals.

Lexington Legends
On July 7, 2021, Jeffress signed with the Lexington Legends of the Atlantic League of Professional Baseball. In 23 relief appearances, Jeffress posted a 1–1 record with a 6.45 ERA and 27 strikeouts. He was released by the team on September 12, 2021.

Diablos Rojos del México
On March 18, 2022, Jeffress signed with the Diablos Rojos del México of the Mexican League. In 17 relief appearances, Jeffress posted a 3–2 record with a 7.36 ERA and 17 strikeouts over 18.1 innings. He was released on June 11, 2022.

Personal life
On August 30, 2007, Jeffress was suspended for 50 games after testing positive for "a drug of abuse," which was reportedly marijuana. This was not his first positive test; he had been given a warning for his first offense. In June 2009, he tested positive a third time, and was suspended for 100 games. One more positive test will result in a lifetime ban for Jeffress.

In late June 2013 while with the Triple-A Buffalo Bisons, Jeffress was diagnosed with juvenile epilepsy, which gave an explanation to the high anxiety and seizures that he had experienced through most of his adult life. Before receiving a proper diagnosis, he self-medicated with marijuana.

On August 26, 2016, at 2:24 a.m. Jeffress was arrested for driving while intoxicated. In January 2018 Jeffress was sentenced to three days in jail/time served after pleading guilty to driving while intoxicated.

References

External links

1987 births
Living people
African-American baseball players
American expatriate baseball players in Canada
Arizona League Brewers players
Baseball players from Virginia
Bravos de Margarita players
American expatriate baseball players in Venezuela
Brevard County Manatees players
Buffalo Bisons (minor league) players
Chicago Cubs players
Diablos Rojos del México players
American expatriate baseball players in Mexico
Dunedin Blue Jays players
Huntsville Stars players
Kansas City Royals players
Leones del Escogido players
Lexington Legends players
American expatriate baseball players in the Dominican Republic
Major League Baseball pitchers
Milwaukee Brewers players
Nashville Sounds players
National League All-Stars
Northwest Arkansas Naturals players
Omaha Storm Chasers players
People from South Boston, Virginia
Peoria Javelinas players
Surprise Rafters players
Texas Rangers players
Toronto Blue Jays players
Wisconsin Timber Rattlers players
West Virginia Power players
21st-century African-American sportspeople
20th-century African-American people